Mahalakshmi Iyer is an Indian playback singer, best known for her Hindi, Assamese and Tamil songs. She has sung in many other Indian languages as well, including Telugu, Marathi, Bengali, Odia, Gujarati and Kannada.

Career

Playback singing
Mahalakshmi made her playback debut with the film Dus in 1997, but the film never completed and released due to the sudden passing of the film's director. The album however was released in 1999 as a tribute. She sang the track Ae Ajnabee with Udit Narayan for A. R. Rahman in Mani Ratnam's Dil Se.. which was her first release as a playback singer and considered to be her debut. Mahalakshmi continued singing for Shankar–Ehsaan–Loy and A.R. Rahman in many films which followed.

Since then she has also sung many serials, jingles, and original albums. She was part of several successful soundtracks such as Mission Kashmir, Yaadein and Saathiya and worked with some of the biggest music composers like A. R. Rahman, Shankar–Ehsaan–Loy, Vishal–Shekhar, Nadeem–Shravan, Jatin–Lalit and more.

She has sung for many Yash Raj Films' biggest hits like Dhoom 2, Bunty Aur Babli, Salaam Namaste, Fanaa, Ta Ra Rum Pum and Jhoom Barabar Jhoom.

She was known for her performances in songs like "Kabhi Sham Dhale" from Sur – The Melody of Life (2002), "Har Taraf" from Rishtey (2002) and for hit songs like "Chup Chup Ke" from Bunty Aur Babli (2005), "Aaj Ki Raat" from Don: The Chase Begins Again (2006) and "Bol Na Halke Halke" from Jhoom Barabar Jhoom.

She sang on the Academy Award-winning song "Jai Ho" for A. R. Rahman in the film Slumdog Millionaire (2008). Specifically, she sang the Hindi words between the short "Jai Ho" chants, as well as portions of the verses (most of which were sung by Sukhwinder Singh).

In the past, she rendered background vocal to the very famous Ghazal of Pankaj Udhas named Aur Ahistaa. She has also rendered her voice to many private album remixes notably Aaja Piya Tohe Pyar and Baahon Mein Chali Aao, which was originally rendered by the legendary Lata Mangeshkar.

Television songs

In 2013, Mahalakshmi Iyer sang a song with Udit Narayan titled "Ek dil banaaya, phir pyar basaaya", penned by Raghvendra Singh music direction of Navin Manish for Rajshri 's TV show Jhilmil Sitaaron Ka Aangan Hoga on Sahara One.

Film songs

Assamese songs

Tamil songs

Telugu

Non-film songs

Awards and honors
 Grammy Award as Vocalist on the recording of "Jai Ho" from the film "Slumdog Millionaire"
Alpha award for Best Playback for Adhar
Maharashtra Kala Niketan Award for Suna Yeti Gharaat
 2016 Filmfare nomination for Best Female Playback Singer – Tamil – "Un Mele Oru Kannu" (Rajini Murugan)
 Best Play Back Singer Maharashtra State Award for Datle Dhuke (Time Pass)
Best playback singer - Orissa State Award for Dheu Kere Kule (From the film "Mimamsa")

References

External links
 
 An interview with Rediff.com
 OpenBeast interview
 An interview with indiaFM.com

Assamese playback singers
Bollywood playback singers
Indian women playback singers
Indian women pop singers
Kannada playback singers
Living people
Marathi-language singers
Marathi playback singers
Performers of Hindu music
Place of birth missing (living people)
Singers from Mumbai
Tamil playback singers
Women musicians from Maharashtra
1970 births
20th-century births
20th-century Indian women singers
20th-century Indian singers
21st-century Indian women singers
21st-century Indian singers